C.C.C.P. is a German synth-pop act led by Rasputin Stoy. They were best known for the 1986 songs "American-Soviets I" and "American-Soviets II", released by Clockwork Germany. This six-minute song themed on the Cold War became a hit on the US Billboard charts, the German Top 75 and other European charts. Their follow-up singles ("Made in Russia" and "Orient Express") hit the number one and number two spots on official music charts in the same week (Hong Kong, Benelux, France and Spain). Their 1990 song "Don't Kill the Rainforest" was also a minor alternative radio hit. Their band name C.C.C.P. is a Romanization of the Cyrillic abbreviation "СССР", which actually translates to "SSSR", short for Союз Советских Социалистических Республик (Soyuz Sovetskikh Sotsialisticheskikh Respublik), the Russian name for the USSR.

C.C.C.P. released their seventh album, Quantic Shamanism Through Digital Western featuring Meyhiel, in January 2008 on the art label MillePlateauxMedia.

The group now only consists of the original band leader Rasputin Stoy a.k.a. Rai Streubel, and Frank Schendler (ex-Beat-A-Max).

In 2018, they released the album Decadance Club on the label Saal 600. In 2020, they had planned to be back on stage with a new lineup.

Discography

Albums
1989: The World
1992: The Hallucinogenic Toreador
2004: Journey Through the Past
2008: Quantic Shamanism Through Digital Western
2018: Decadance Club (Blue!)

Live albums
1992: Live Houston 1990
2013: C.C.C.P. Live Houston 2013

Compilations
1992: Best of C.C.C.P.: 1985–1992
1997: C.C.C.P. & Beat-A-Max: Best of C.C.C.P. & Beat-A-Max
2013: Official the World Remixes 2014

Singles
1986: "American-Soviets"
1987: "Made in Russia"
1988: "Orient Express"
1989: "United States of Europe"
1990: "Don't Kill the Rain Forest"
1990: "Liquid Sky"
1991: "Freedom & Liberty"
1991: "In Memory of Salvador Dali"
1991: "Conquestadores"/"Strength versus Courage"
1991: "Orient Express '91"
1996: "The Preacher"
1999: "3rd Millennium"
2018: "Decadance Club"
2018: "Mirror of Your Soul"
2018: "Twelve" (Tibor's Mix)

References

External links
Official website

German synthpop groups
Musical groups established in 1986
Musical groups disestablished in 1992
Musical groups reestablished in 2004